Sarumen Chaseki (猿面茶席) is a historic chashitsu located in Nagoya Castle, central Japan. Sarumen Chaseki and Bōgaku Chaseki are collectively called Sarumen Bōgaku Chaseki (猿面望嶽茶席).

History 

The tea house was originally constructed with materials from Kiyosu Castle based on the design by Lord Furuta Oribe (1544-1615). The pillar on the right side of the tokonoma, called toko-bashira (床柱), is made of wood, specially prepared for the purpose. At the upper part are two wood knots. According to legend Oda Nobunaga saw the pillar with the two knots and remarked to Toyotomi Hideyoshi that it looked like his face. Hideyoshi was called "little monkey" due to the appearance of his face. Thus the house received its name from the pillar.

The original tea house was designated as a national treasure in 1936. It was destroyed during the bombing of Nagoya in World War II. It was rebuilt in 1949 (Shōwa 24). The teahouse is used for various events and functions. A special type of tea ceremony is held in honour of Haruhime (1641–1658) where a very large chawan 大福茶碗 with a diameter of 34cm is held. The bowl can only be drunk with the assistance of two persons. A faithful reproduction of the front part of the house is located in the Tokugawa Art Museum which showcases a rotating exhibit of Japanese tea utensils.

See also 
 Rokusō-an originally at Nara  
 Hassō-an (八窓庵) originally at Osaka

References

External links 
 木造都市の夜明け  :  天下三名席『猿面茶席』－名古屋城における古材再利用

Buildings and structures in Japan destroyed during World War II
Chashitsu
Nagoya Castle 
Old National Treasures of Japan 
Rebuilt buildings and structures in Japan